Bigden is an English surname. Notable people with the surname include:

 James Bigden (1880–after 1910), English footballer
 Alf Bigden (1932–2007), British drummer

See also
 

English-language surnames